Shocking Dark (also known as Terminator II, Terminator 2, Aliens 2, Aliennators, and Contaminator) is an Italian science-fiction film written by Claudio Fragasso, produced by Franco Gaudenzi and directed by Bruno Mattei.

Although the film was promoted as a rip-off of James Cameron's The Terminator (1984), it is primarily a rip-off of Cameron's subsequent film Aliens (1986). It was released in some countries as Terminator II, as it had been made two years before Terminator 2: Judgment Day (1991).

Background
Despite the film's original title and artwork presenting it as a sequel to The Terminator, it is not officially associated with that film. The plot has more in common with Aliens. Two years after Mattei's film came out, Terminator 2: Judgment Day (the official Terminator sequel) was released. Mattei's film was not released in the United States, especially under its original title due to licensing problems.

Cast
 Cristopher Ahrens as Samuel Fuller
 Haven Tyler as Sara
 Geretta Giancarlo Field as Koster
 Tony Lombardi as Lieutenant Franzini
 Mark Steinborn as Commander Dalton Bond
 Dominica Coulson as Samantha
 Mark Zielinski as Stephano
 Clive Ricke as Drake
 Paul Norman Allen as Kowalsky
 Cortland Reilly as Caine
 Richard Ross as Price
 Bruce McFarland as Parson
 Al McFarland as Raphelson

Release
Up until 2018, the film had never been released on video in the United States for legal reasons. It was released in countries such as Japan, Brazil, and the film's native country Italy.

Severin Films released the film (under its Shocking Dark title) on Blu-ray on 29 May 2018.

References

External links
 
 Terminator II at Variety Distribution

Terminator (franchise)
1989 films
Italian science fiction films
1980s science fiction films
Films directed by Bruno Mattei
Films scored by Carlo Maria Cordio
Films set in Venice
1980s Italian-language films
Unofficial sequel films
1990s Italian films
1980s Italian films